Lilltjärnen is a lake in Strömsund Municipality in Jämtland, Sweden.

Lakes of Jämtland County